Scythris latilineella is a moth of the family Scythrididae. It was described by K. Nupponen in 2013. It is found in central Spain. The habitat consists of xerotermic rocky slopes with sparse vegetation.

The wingspan is 9.5-11.5 mm.

Etymology
The species name refers to the broad streak in the fold on the forewing and is derived from Latin latus (meaning broad) and linea (meaning a line).

References

latilineella
Moths described in 2013